John Harold Lambert  (born July 8, 1952) is an American former professional football player who was a middle linebacker in the National Football League (NFL). Recognized by the Pro Football Hall of Fame in 1990 as "the greatest linebacker of his era," Lambert was the starting middle linebacker for four Super Bowl-winning teams during an 11-year career with the Pittsburgh Steelers. He played college football at Kent State University.

Early years through college
Lambert was born in Mantua, Ohio. He played football for Kent State, winning two All-Mid-American Conference linebacker honors. Don James was his head coach. Alabama football coach Nick Saban and former Missouri football coach Gary Pinkel were his teammates. During his college career, he was originally going to study to become a veterinarian.

Professional career
Lambert was selected by the Steelers in the second round of the 1974 NFL Draft, though many pro football coaches and scouts thought he was too small to play linebacker in the NFL. (Lambert played quarterback at Crestwood HS before switching to defensive end at Kent State.)

Lambert was the prototypical middle linebacker for what became the Tampa Two defense.  Bud Carson, in his "Double-Rotating Zone" defense where safeties played back in a two-deep zone and the corner-backs played in two shallow zones or in bump-and-run coverage, instead of having the middle linebacker close to the line in run support, had the middle linebacker drop back into a middle zone to cover the seam between the safeties.  Middle linebackers had not been tasked in such a way previously (Dick Butkus and Ray Nitschke being the epitomes of the run-support middle linebacker), but Lambert's size, speed, and talents facilitated the new role.

The Steelers took a chance on Lambert when he replaced injured middle linebacker Henry Davis. Lambert went on to earn the NFL Defensive Rookie of the Year Award as a central figure on a great Steeler defense that went on to win their first Super Bowl by beating the Minnesota Vikings 16-6 in Super Bowl IX.

Lambert prided himself on his ability to hit hard and intimidate the opposition. He was the Steelers starting middle linebacker for eight seasons when the team primarily used the 4–3 defense & right inside linebacker for three seasons after the Steelers switched to the 3–4 defense, with Loren Toews being the regular starter at the other inside linebacker position late in Lambert's career though Lambert retained the "Mike" role as the team's signal-caller on defense. According to Steelers media guides, Lambert averaged 146 tackles per season through his 10th year. He recorded only 19 in his 11th and final season because of an injury.

Lambert amassed 28 career interceptions, 1,479 career tackles (1,045 solo), and (officially) 23 sacks. In a nine-year span, Jack Lambert was named to nine straight Pro Bowls and was NFL Defensive Player of the Year once.

Lambert's four upper front teeth were missing as a result of taking an elbow in basketball during high school. Although he had a removable partial denture he wore in public, he didn't wear it during games, and pictures of Lambert's toothless snarl became an iconic image of the famous Steeler defense.

In 1976, Lambert assumed the role as leader of the Steelers after star defensive tackle "Mean Joe" Greene missed several games due to a chronic back injury. After quarterback Terry Bradshaw, receiver Lynn Swann and several other starters went down with injuries, the Steelers struggled to a 1–4 record. At a "players only" meeting, Lambert made it clear that "the only way we are going to the playoffs to defend our title is to win them all from here out." In a remarkable nine-game span, the Steelers defense allowed only two touchdowns and a total of 28 points, including five shutouts.  The Steelers won all of these games and finished at 10–4. The defense gave up only a record low 138 points for the entire season. Eight of the eleven defensive starters on the Steelers made the Pro Bowl that year. Jack Lambert was named NFL Defensive Player of the Year in 1976.

During the 1984 season, a severe and recurring case of turf toe sidelined him, after which he retired. A bachelor throughout his NFL career, Lambert got married after retirement.

He has been a long-time volunteer deputy wildlife officer and he now focuses on coaching youth baseball and basketball, tending to his land and maintaining his town's ball fields.  He also played on a men's ice hockey team in nearby Harmarville, Pennsylvania.

Broadcasting career
Lambert was a member of the NFL on Westwood One as an analyst.

Honors
In 2004, the Fox Sports Net series The Sports List named Lambert as the toughest football player of all time.

While Lambert's number, 58, is one of many jersey numbers "unofficially retired" by the team (the Steelers have retired three jersey numbers-number 70, 75 and 32, worn by Ernie Stautner, Joe Greene and Franco Harris respectively), his jersey number has perhaps gotten the most attention out of all such jersey numbers. When Lambert retired, he reportedly told the equipment manager that he was not to issue number 58 again. Lambert later fought with the equipment manager outside of the facility because of a misunderstanding about his number.

Lambert was inducted into the Pro Football Hall of Fame in 1990. Lambert was voted to the Pittsburgh Steelers 75th Anniversary team. NFL Network's countdown show, NFL Top 10, named Lambert the number 8 "Most Feared Tackler" and the number 5 "Pittsburgh Steeler" of all time.

Lambert remains popular among Steeler fans and was arguably the most feared defender on the team despite the fact that some have regarded Jack Ham as a better outside linebacker than Lambert as a middle linebacker during the Steelers dominance of the 1970s. This has been attributed to Lambert looking directly at the quarterback and vice versa before the start of plays. Adding to his mystique has been Lambert's reclusiveness in retirement; aside from his Hall of Fame induction and the Steelers last game at Three Rivers Stadium,  Lambert has rarely made any public appearances related to football, preferring to live a private life.

References

External links

 

1952 births
Living people
People from Mantua, Ohio
Players of American football from Ohio
American football middle linebackers
Kent State Golden Flashes football players
Pittsburgh Steelers players
American Conference Pro Bowl players
National Football League Defensive Rookie of the Year Award winners
Pro Football Hall of Fame inductees
National Football League announcers
National Football League Defensive Player of the Year Award winners